No Mystery (1975) is the fifth studio album by  jazz-rock fusion band Return to Forever.

Production
All members of the group contributed compositions to this album. Side 1 contains heavily funk-influenced material composed by each member of the group, whereas Side 2 is filled by Chick Corea compositions. Chick Corea won the Grammy Award for Best Instrumental Jazz Performance, Individual or Group Grammy Award in 1975 for this album.

Track listing

Personnel 
Return to Forever
 Chick Corea – acoustic piano, Fender Rhodes electric piano, Hohner clavinet, Yamaha electric organ, synthesizers (ARP Odyssey, Minimoog), snare drum, marimba, vocals
 Al Di Meola – electric guitar, acoustic guitar
 Stanley Clarke – electric bass, acoustic bass, Yamaha electric organ, synthesizer, vocals
 Lenny White – drums, percussion, congas, marimba

Technical personnel
 Shelly Yakus – engineer
 Tom Rabstenek – mastering
 Bill Levy – cover art direction

Chart performance

References

External links 
 Return to Forever - No Mystery (1975) album review by Michael G. Nastos, credits & releases at AllMusic
 Return to Forever - No Mystery (1975) album releases & credits at Discogs
 Return to Forever - No Mystery (1975) album credits & user reviews at ProgArchives.com

1975 albums
Albums recorded at Record Plant (New York City)
Polydor Records albums
Return to Forever albums
Grammy Award for Best Jazz Instrumental Album